Sokolov (until 1948 Falknov nad Ohří) is a town in the Karlovy Vary Region of the Czech Republic. It has about 22,000 inhabitants.

Administrative parts
Villages of Hrušková and Novina and area of former village of Vítkov are administrative parts of Sokolov.

Etymology
The meaning of the original German name Falkenau was "falcon's riparian forest", the original Czech name Falknov was created by transcription of the German name. According to legend, it was related to hobby of knight Sebastian, who is said to have been the founder of the town, of falconry. After the World War II, when it was customary to change names of German origin, the town was renamed Sokolov. According to communist propaganda at the time, the name was not related to a falcon (i.e. sokol in Czech), but to the Battle of Sokolovo in which Czechoslovak soldiers had fought alongside Soviet soldiers on the Eastern Front in World War II.

Geography
It lies mostly in the Sokolov Basin. The Ohře River flows through the town.

On the eastern outskirts of the town there is Lake Michal, an artificial lake created by flooding of former coal quarry.

History

The first written mention of Sokolov is from 13 April 1279 under the name Falkenau / Falknov. The town was a property of noble families of Nothaft and later Schlick. The Schlick family built here a small castle, which was rebuilt to a château in the 16th century.

After the Battle of White Mountain the Nostic family gained Sokolov. During the Thirty Years' War the town and the château was repeatedly burned out. The town and the château was recovered in the 1760s by Jan Hartvík Nostic. In the 18th century, there was a great expansion of urban crafts and hop growing.

Until 1918, the town was part of the Austrian monarchy (Austrian side after the compromise of 1867), head of the Falkenau a.d. Eger District, one of the 94 Bezirkshauptmannschaften in Bohemia. In 1919, the town, being part of the continuous German Sprachraum, was proclaimed part of the Republic of German-Austria, but shortly afterwards became part of the First Czechoslovak Republic.

From 1938 to 1945 it was one of the municipalities in Sudetenland. During World War II, Falkenau was the site of a sub-camp of the Flossenbürg concentration camp. The camp at Falkenau was captured by the U.S. 1st Infantry Division on 6 May 1945. Nearly all of the town's population, being Germans, were expelled after 1945.

Demographics

Transport
The D6 motorway runs through the town.

Sport
The town is home to a professional football club, FK Baník Sokolov.

Sights
The Church of Saint James the Great is one of the landmarks of the town centre. It was first documented in the 13th century and rebuilt in the late Renaissance style in 1632–1637. In 1671–1681, it was modified in the early Baroque style. The church tower is built in the spirit of the Saxon Renaissance.

The Sokolov Château was built on the site of a former water fortress in late Renaissance and early Baroque styles. In 1800–1805, the building was modified in the Neoclassical style. Since 1960, the château has been the seat of the Regional Museum, focused mainly on the development of mining and the history of the region.

Notable people

Ernst Hammer (1884–1957), German military officer
Václav Blažek (born 1959), historical linguist
Štefan Füle (born 1962), diplomat
Markéta Vondroušová (born 1999), tennis player

Twin towns – sister cities

Sokolov is twinned with:
 Saalfeld, Germany
 Schwandorf, Germany

References

External links

Regional Tourist Portal 

Populated places in Sokolov District
Cities and towns in the Czech Republic
Mining communities in the Czech Republic